Stefano Del Sante (born 13 January 1987) is an Italian footballer who plays as a forward for Eccellenza marche club A.S.D. Fabriano Cerreto.

Career
Del Sante started his career at hometown club Perugia where he played twice in Serie B 2004–05. After the bankrupt of Perugia, he chose not to follow the new team at Serie C1 and joined Fiorentina's Primavera team. In summer 2006, he was loaned to Serie C1 side Pizzighettone but after a handful appearances, he joined Serie C2 side Varese on loan in January 2007. In 2008–09 season, he scored 15 goals for the Lega Pro Seconda Divisione Champion as team top scorer.

In June 2009, Varese signed him in co-ownership deal for €120,000. But at Lega Pro Prima Divisione, he had to compete with Matteo Momentè and Pietro Tripoli to pair for Osariemen Ebagua in 2 strikers or 3 strikers formation. He won promotion to Serie B as runner-up and playoffs winner.

In July 2010 he was loaned back to Prima Divisione, for Pavia, but in January 2011 he was exchanged with Marco Veronese of Lecco.

On 12 July 2013 Del Sante was signed by Vigor Lamezia.

On 30 June 2015 Del Sante was signed by Pavia.

In January 2016 he is transferred to Juve Stabia; in January 2017 he moved to Ancona.

On 28 September 2018, Del Sante signed for A.C. Prato. In August 2019, he moved to ASD Cannara. He left the club in December 2019 and joined fellow league club A.C. Bastia 1924.

Honours
Varese
Lega Pro Seconda Divisione: 2009

References

External links
 
 Profile at AIC.Football.it 

1987 births
Footballers from Umbria
Sportspeople from Perugia
Living people
Italian footballers
Association football forwards
A.C. Perugia Calcio players
ACF Fiorentina players
A.S. Pizzighettone players
S.S.D. Varese Calcio players
F.C. Pavia players
Calcio Lecco 1912 players
Mantova 1911 players
Vigor Lamezia players
S.S. Juve Stabia players
A.C. Ancona players
S.S.D. Lucchese 1905 players
A.C. Prato players
Serie B players
Serie C players
Serie D players